Evans Nii Oma Hunter (died 4 June 2013) was a Ghanaian veteran actor, producer, director and writer who contributed to the growth of the local movie and theater industry.

Career
He was the president of the Ghana Actors Guild (GAG) from 1989 to 1996 and was the founder of artistic director of the Audience Awareness Artistic Organisation.

In 1983, he was a cast as the character Addey in the King Ampaw directed comedy-drama Kukurantumi. In 1988, he had a starring role as Rashid in the John Akomfrah directed drama Testament. Other prominent roles include that of Francis Essien in the 1989 Kwaw Ansah directed drama Heritage Africa, and as Kokuroko in the 2006 King Ampaw directed comedy No Time to Die, as well as a role in Kwaw Ansah's play titled A Mother's Tears.

Filmography
 Kukurantumi 
 No Time To Die
 Ama
 Heritage Africa 
 The Fortune Island
 Testament
 Nana Akoto

References

External links
 

Year of birth missing
2013 deaths
Ghanaian actors